José de Jesús Robinson González (born 14 February 1945 in Reynosa, Tamaulipas) is a Mexican former diver who competed in the 1964 Summer Olympics, in the 1968 Summer Olympics, and in the 1972 Summer Olympics.

References

1945 births
Living people
Mexican male divers
Olympic divers of Mexico
Divers at the 1964 Summer Olympics
Divers at the 1968 Summer Olympics
Divers at the 1972 Summer Olympics
Sportspeople from Tamaulipas
People from Reynosa
Pan American Games medalists in diving
Pan American Games bronze medalists for Mexico
Divers at the 1971 Pan American Games
Medalists at the 1971 Pan American Games
20th-century Mexican people
21st-century Mexican people